Semiramis was the legendary queen of King Ninus who succeeded him to the throne of Assyria.

Semiramis or Sémiramis may also refer to:

 584 Semiramis, a minor planet
 Sémiramis (tragedy), a play by Voltaire
 Semiramis (band), an Italian progressive rock group
 Sémiramis (Catel), an 1802 opera by Charles-Simon Catel
 Sémiramis (Destouches), an opera by André Cardinal Destouches
 Semiramis Hotel in Cairo 
 Semiramis Hotel bombing a terrorist attack resulting in 25-26 deaths.
 Semiramis Pekkan (b. 1948), a Turkish singer and actress

See also
 Semiramide
 Semiramide (Mysliveček)